Liverpool is an unincorporated community in St. Helena Parish, Louisiana, United States.

References

Unincorporated communities in St. Helena Parish, Louisiana
Unincorporated communities in Louisiana